Johan Liébus (born 5 November 1978, in Tours) is a French professional football player who plays as a goalkeeper for Louhans-Cuiseaux.

He played on the professional level in Division 1 for Metz, and in Ligue 2 for Gueugnon and Reims.

References

1978 births
Living people
French footballers
Ligue 1 players
Ligue 2 players
Le Mans FC players
FC Metz players
FC Gueugnon players
Stade de Reims players
Louhans-Cuiseaux FC players
Sportspeople from Tours, France
Association football goalkeepers
Footballers from Centre-Val de Loire